The Los Esteros Critical Energy Facility is a power plant in San Jose, California, operated by Calpine. Located near the San Jose-Milpitas border, it began operations in 2003 with an initial capacity of 188 megawatts.
In 2013 it was upgraded to 309 megawatts.  The facility uses four natural gas turbines run as a combined-cycle facility where the exhaust from the gas turbine is used to create steam that drives a steam generator.

See also

List of power stations in California

References

Buildings and structures in San Jose, California
Economy of San Jose, California
Science and technology in the San Francisco Bay Area
2003 establishments in California
Environment of the San Francisco Bay Area
Natural gas-fired power stations in California
Energy in the San Francisco Bay Area